Teece is an English language surname. Notable persons with this name include:

 Ashley H. Teece (1879–1943), Congregationalist minister in Australia, son of Richard Teece
 Cecil Teece (1864–1917),  politician in New South Wales, Australia, brother of William
 David Teece (born 1948), US-based organizational theorist
 Richard Teece (1847–1928), Australian actuary and general manager of the Australian Mutual Provident Society
 William Teece (1845–1890), a politician  in New South Wales, Australia, brother of Cecil